Back mutation may refer to:
 Back mutation, a sound change in Old English
 Back mutation, a type of genetic mutation